A.I.R. is the third studio album by Japanese singer and songwriter Rina Aiuchi. It was released on October 15, 2003 through Giza Studio. The title of the album stands for Aiuchi Infinity Rina. The album consists of six previous released singles. The single Kuuki has received renewed version under title Album version. The album charted #1 rank in Oricon during its first week. It charted for nine weeks and sold a total of 182,477 copies.

Track listing

In media
∞ Infinity - ending theme for Nihon TV program Sport Urugusu
Full Jump - theme song for Nihon TV baseball program THE BASEBALL 2003 World Cup
Kuuki - ending theme for Nihon TV program Angle☆Now!
Sincerely Yours - insert song for Fuji TV variety program The Letters ~Kazoku no Ai ni Arigatou~
Kaze no nai Umi de Dakishimete - ending theme for Anime television series Tsuribaka Nisshi
Over Shine - ending theme for Nihon TV program Miyaku Yuuji no Doshirouto
Deep Freeze - ending theme for Yomiuri program Pro Doumyaku
Code Crush - opening theme for PlayStation 2 game Mega Man X7 as Japanese Intro

References 

2003 albums
Being Inc. albums
Giza Studio albums
Japanese-language albums
Albums produced by Daiko Nagato